The Collective of Democratic Mass Organizations and Political Parties is a political alliance in Burkina Faso (former Upper Volta). 
It was founded in December 1998 by leftist political parties, unions and NGOs.

The CODMPP is led by Halidou Ouédraogo.

Left-wing political party alliances
Political party alliances in Burkina Faso